Ammar Shamali is a Syrian football forward who played for Syria in the 1996 Asian Cup.

References

External links

Ammar Shamali at 11v11.com

1970 births
Syrian footballers
Living people
People from Jableh
Tishreen SC players
Syria international footballers
1996 AFC Asian Cup players
Association football forwards
Syrian football managers
Expatriate football managers in Oman
Syrian Premier League players